"Sticky Sticky" is a song by South Korean girl group Hello Venus. It was released on November 6, 2014 under Fantagio and is the group's fourth single overall. It is the first release to feature new members Seoyoung and Yeoreum following the departures of Yooara and Yoonjo after Pledis Entertainment and Fantagio had ended their partnership in July 2014.

Music video
The music video was released on November 6, 2014 and is directed by Hong Won-ki of Zanybros.

Track listing

Charts

Single charts

Album charts

Sales

Release history

References

Korean-language songs
2014 singles
2014 songs
Songs written by Brave Brothers
Hello Venus songs